Jeff Hutchins (born April 23, 1978) is a Canadian-British former professional ice hockey left winger who is currently an Associate coach for the Fife Flyers of the Elite Ice Hockey League.

Hutchins played in the EIHL for the Coventry Blaze, Belfast Giants, Newcastle Vipers, Edinburgh Capitals, Sheffield Steelers and Dundee Stars. He also played for the Great Britain national ice hockey team.

Hutchins was player-coach of the Dundee Stars between 2012 and 2015. He retired as a player in 2015 after becoming head coach of China Dragon in Asia League Ice Hockey. 

Ahead of the 2016-17 season, Hutchins joined the Fife Flyers as an assistant coach to Todd Dutiaume. In June 2022, Hutchins' Fife role changed slightly with him being named Associate Coach to Dutiaume.

References

External links

1978 births
Living people
Belfast Giants players
Bracknell Bees players
Bridgeport Sound Tigers players
British ice hockey left wingers
Canadian ice hockey left wingers
Coventry Blaze players
Dundee Stars players
Edinburgh Capitals players
Ice hockey people from Ontario
Grand Rapids Griffins players
Houston Aeros (1994–2013) players
Mississippi Sea Wolves players
Newcastle Vipers players
Rochester Americans players
Sheffield Steelers players
Canadian expatriate ice hockey players in England
Canadian expatriate ice hockey players in Scotland
Canadian expatriate ice hockey players in the United States
Canadian expatriate ice hockey players in Northern Ireland
Naturalised citizens of the United Kingdom
Canadian ice hockey coaches
British ice hockey coaches
Canadian expatriate sportspeople in China
British expatriate sportspeople in China
British expatriate ice hockey people
Naturalised sports competitors